The 2007 Subway Fresh Fit 500 was the eighth race of the 2007 NASCAR Nextel Cup Season, and it ran on April 21, 2007, at Phoenix International Raceway in Avondale, Arizona.

Summary
The race also served as the first night race of the season, and the third race to use the Car of Tomorrow template. In the end, Jeff Gordon scored a historic victory.

Race

The third CoT race of the season would be the first test of the new car's aerodynamics. Previously, the CoT definitely kept the racing closer as evidenced by the two half car length finishes. Joe Gibbs Racing's Tony Stewart and Denny Hamlin would be seeking out the team's first victory with the new car. From the drop of the green, Gordon, Stewart, and Hamlin established themselves as the dominant cars of the race. Stewart, despite leading 132 of the 312 laps, would not find victory circle on Saturday night. Hamlin would not fare as well as his teammate as a speeding penalty put him on the tail end of the lead lap. Luck and pit strategy would eventually play a factor in the race. All of that came together during a series of green-flag pit stops on lap 283. Gordon was on pit road  when the caution came out. However, quick work by Gordon's pit crew enabled him to stay on the lead lap before a dominant Tony Stewart lapped him. On the lap 298 restart, Tony Stewart made an incredible pass for the lead going 3-wide between Gordon and the tail end car of Martin Truex Jr. However, Gordon would pass Stewart again on lap 300 and would hold on for the win.

The weekend was historic for Jeff Gordon, as the win not only was his first at Phoenix, but it would also be his 76th career victory, tying Dale Earnhardt for 6th on the all-time win list. After the race, Gordon carried a flag with Earnhardt's car number, 3, emblazoned on it during the victory lap.

Gordon was also the first Nextel Cup race winner at Phoenix from the pole position.

Qualifying
Gordon won his third pole of the year, and 59th of his career, tying Darrell Waltrip on the all-time list.  His winning lap was 133.136 miles per hour.  Michael Waltrip, Darrell's brother, missed his seventh straight race after making the Daytona 500 to start the year.

Tribute
All teams carried decal stickers in memory of the 32 people killed in the Virginia Tech massacre the previous Monday; the stickers consisted of the athletic department's logo.  In addition, Morgan-McClure Motorsports altered the look of the #4 car driven by Ward Burton to include the logo on the hood of the car.  (Burton is from nearby South Boston, Virginia, and Morgan-McClure is based in Abingdon.)  Many drivers, including Gordon, Stewart, and Hamlin, wore VT hats throughout the weekend, and PIR displayed the school flag.

In addition, many mechanics are from the school;  most notable of these is Darian Grubb of the #25 Hendrick Motorsports Chevrolet Impala.

Race results

References

External links
Race results
Standings after race
Starting lineup

Subway Fresh Fit 500
Subway Fresh Fit 500
NASCAR races at Phoenix Raceway
April 2007 sports events in the United States